Stade Bordelais are a French rugby union club, based in Bordeaux. 
The club was established in 1889. Bordelais were a major force in the French championship during the 1900s. Until 2005–06, the senior team competed in the second level of domestic competition, the Pro D2, but was merged with the senior team of CA Bordeaux-Bègles Gironde into Union Stade Bordelais-CA Bègles Bordeaux Gironde or USBCABBG. The club only keeps youth teams and a women's team that currently plays in the Second Division.

The club currently plays at Stade Sainte Germaine, which holds 5,000.

Honors
 French championship : 1899, 1904, 1905, 1906, 1907, 1909, 1911
 Finalist French championship : 1900, 1901, 1902, 1908, 1910
Winner of the promotion back to 1st Division 1989 ** Runner-up Coupe de France : 1943 et 1944
 Challenge de l'Espérance: 1997

Finals results

French championship

Famous players
Jean-Jacques Conilh de Beyssac
Eugène Billac
Maurice Boyau
Maurice Bruneau
Julien Dufau
Albert Dupouy
Marc Giacardy
René Graciet
Marcel Laffitte
Pascal Laporte
Jean Laudouar
Maurice Leuvielle
Alphonse Massé
Vincent Moscato
William Téchoueyres

References
 Histoire du sport en France: du Stade Bordelais au S.B.U.C.: 1889 - 1939 de Jean-Paul Callède, éd. Maison des sciences de l'homme d'Aquitaine, 1993

External links
 Official website

Stade Bordelais
Bordeaux
1889 establishments in France
Rugby clubs established in 1889